Zapole may refer to the following places:
Zapole, Pajęczno County in Łódź Voivodeship (central Poland)
Zapole, Sieradz County in Łódź Voivodeship (central Poland)
Zapole, Otwock County in Masovian Voivodeship (east-central Poland)
Zapole, Subcarpathian Voivodeship (south-east Poland)
Zapole, West Pomeranian Voivodeship (north-west Poland)

See also